Below are the squads for the 2008 AFC Challenge Cup in India, that took place between 30 July and 13 August 2008. The players' listed age is their age on the tournament's opening day (30 July 2008).

Group A

Turkmenistan
Coach: Rahim Kurbanmamedov

Tajikistan
Coach: Pulod Kodirov

India
Coach:  Bob Houghton

Afghanistan
Coach: Mohammad Yousef Kargar

Group B

North Korea
Coach: Jo Tong-Sop

Sri Lanka
Coach:  Jang Jung

Myanmar
Coach:  Marcos Falopa

Nepal
Coach: Birat Krishna Shrestha

References 
Tajikistan - India match summary at The-AFC.com 
Afghanistan - Turkmenistan match summary at The-AFC.com 
DPR Korea - Myanmar match summary at The-AFC.com 
Nepal - Sri Lanka match summary at The-AFC.com 

2006
Squads